The 1968 World Championship Tennis circuit was the inaugural tour  of the (WCT) one of the two rival professional male tennis tours of 1968 the other being the National Tennis League. The tour began on 22 January in Sydney, Australia and ended on 13 October in Durban, South Africa.

Calendar
This is the complete schedule of events on the 1968 WCT circuit, with player progression documented until the quarterfinals stage.

January

February

March

April

May

June 
No events

July

August

September

October

November

December 
No events

References

External links

World Championship Tennis circuit seasons
World Championship Tennis